The 23rd Street station was a station on the demolished IRT Second Avenue Line in Manhattan, New York City. It had two levels. The lower level had two tracks and two side platforms and served local trains. The upper level had one track for express trains. The next stop to the north was 34th Street. The next stop to the south was 19th Street. The station closed on June 13, 1942.

References

External links

http://www.nycsubway.org/perl/caption.pl?/img/maps/calcagno-1920-elevated.gif

IRT Second Avenue Line stations
Railway stations in the United States opened in 1880
1880 establishments in New York (state)
Railway stations closed in 1942
Former elevated and subway stations in Manhattan
23rd Street (Manhattan)